The Navarro–Frenk–White (NFW) profile is a spatial mass distribution of dark matter fitted to dark matter halos identified in N-body simulations by Julio Navarro, Carlos Frenk and Simon White. The NFW profile is one of the most commonly used model profiles for dark matter halos.

Density distribution

In the NFW profile, the density of dark matter as a function of radius is given by:

 

where ρ0 and the "scale radius", Rs, are parameters which vary from halo to halo.

The integrated mass within some radius Rmax is

 

The total mass is divergent, but it is often useful to take the edge of the halo to be the virial radius, Rvir, which is related to the "concentration parameter", c, and scale radius via

 

(Alternatively, one can define a radius at which the average density within this radius is  times the critical or mean density of the universe, resulting in a similar relation: .

The total mass in the halo within  is

 

The specific value of c is roughly 10 or 15 for the Milky Way, and may range from 4 to 40 for halos of various sizes.

This gives  

 

where 
  is the mean density of the halo,
  is from the mass calculation, and 
  is the fractional distance to the virial radius.

Higher order moments
The integral of the squared density is

 

so that the mean squared density inside of Rmax is

 

which for the virial radius simplifies to

 

and the mean squared density inside the scale radius is simply

Gravitational potential
Solving Poisson's equation gives the gravitational potential
 

The acceleration due to the NFW potential is:

where .

Radius of the maximum circular velocity
 
where  is the positive root of 
 .
Maximum circular velocity is also related to the characteristic density and length scale of NFW profile:

Dark matter simulations
Over a broad range of halo mass and redshift, the NFW profile approximates the equilibrium configuration of dark matter halos produced in simulations of collisionless dark matter particles by numerous groups of scientists. Before the dark matter virializes, the distribution of dark matter deviates from an NFW profile, and significant substructure is observed in simulations both during and after the collapse of the halos.

Alternative models, in particular the Einasto profile, have been shown to represent the dark matter profiles of simulated halos as well as or better than the NFW profile by including an additional third parameter. The Einasto profile has a finite (zero) central slope, unlike the NFW profile which has a divergent (infinite) central density. Because of the limited resolution of N-body simulations, it is not yet known which model provides the best description of the central densities of simulated dark-matter halos.

Simulations assuming different cosmological initial conditions produce halo populations in which the two parameters of the NFW profile follow different mass-concentration relations, depending on cosmological properties such as the density of the universe and the nature of the very early process which created all structure. Observational measurements of this relation thus offer a route to constraining these properties.

Observations of halos
The dark matter density profiles of massive galaxy clusters can be measured directly by gravitational lensing and agree well with the NFW profiles predicted for cosmologies with the parameters inferred from other data. For lower mass halos, gravitational lensing is too noisy to give useful results for individual objects, but accurate measurements can still be made by averaging the profiles of many similar systems. For the main body of the halos, the agreement with the predictions remains good down to halo masses as small as those of the halos surrounding isolated galaxies like our own. The inner regions of halos are beyond the reach of lensing measurements, however, and other techniques give results which disagree with NFW predictions for the dark matter distribution inside 
the visible galaxies which lie at halo centers.

Observations of the inner regions of bright galaxies like the Milky Way and M31 may be compatible with the NFW profile, but this is open to debate.  The NFW dark matter profile is not consistent with observations of the inner regions of low surface brightness galaxies, which have less central mass than predicted. This is known as the cusp-core or cuspy halo problem.
It is currently debated whether this discrepancy is a consequence of the nature of the dark matter, of the influence of dynamical processes during galaxy formation, or of shortcomings in dynamical modelling of the observational data.

See also
 Einasto profile

References

Astrophysics
Dark matter